Dane Hills is a large area on the western side of the English city of Leicester, consisting of the smaller areas of Newfoundpool,  Western Park, and New Parks, which is bounded by Glenfield to the west. A cave in this area was known as Black Annis's Bower, the cave being reputed to be the lair of a witch or hag of that name.

References

Areas of Leicester
Leicester